Franck Angong (born 5 July 2002) is a Cameroonian professional footballer who plays as a midfielder for Spanish club Intercity.

Career

Angong started his career with Dominican Republic side Cibao. In 2020, Angong joined the youth academy of Barcelona, one of Spain's most successful clubs. In August 2021, Angong joined Liga Portugal 2 club S.C. Covilhã on a season-long loan. On 1 February 2022, Angong joined Cultural Leonesa on loan for the remainder of the season.

References

External links
 Frank Angong at playmakerstats.com

2002 births
Living people
Cameroonian footballers
Association football midfielders
Cameroonian expatriate footballers
Expatriate footballers in the Dominican Republic
Expatriate footballers in Spain
Expatriate footballers in Portugal
Cameroonian expatriate sportspeople in Spain
Cameroonian expatriate sportspeople in Portugal
Cibao FC players
S.C. Covilhã players
Cultural Leonesa footballers
Liga Dominicana de Fútbol players
Liga Portugal 2 players
Primera Federación players
CF Intercity players